The Rue des Entrepreneurs in Paris, France is an overall residential street located in the Paris 15th arrondissement. It is running from Avenue Émile Zola (at number 76) to rue de la Croix Nivert (at number 102). It is about 800 metres long and 14 metres wide. Its name comes from the entrepreneurs of the 19th century who owned land nearby, after its creation in 1851.

The street displays a noticeable diversity of architectural styles, mixing haussmannian buildings and modern constructions from the 80's.

Among remarkable monuments, there is the Saint-Jean-Bapstiste de Grenelle Church, built in 1828.

References

Entrepreneurs